Anna Rosina Kliest Gambold (1762 - 1821) was an American Moravian missionary and diarist.

Born Anna Rosina Kliest in Bethlehem, Pennsylvania, Gambold was educated in the single sisters' choir of her community. Beginning in 1788 she was the head teacher of the Seminary for Young Ladies in her birth town, remaining in the role until 1805. There she taught numerous subjects including natural science; later she was the first to make a botanical survey of northern Georgia; in March 1819 an article she had written, in which she had cataloged flowers from along the Conasauga River denoting their scientific names and the uses of the plants in Cherokee medicine and culture, was published in the American Journal of Science and Arts. She married John Gambold in 1805, and moved with him to Springplace, Georgia to evangelize among the Cherokee people. In Springplace the couple established a school. They were, however, hampered in their efforts at missionary work by the complexities of the Cherokee language. Eventually, as part of the removal of the Cherokee from their ancestral lands, the mission was shuttered by the government of the United States. Anna Rosina kept a diary of her time in Georgia; it has been edited and was published in 2007. Kliest died in Springplace and is buried at the mission cemetery there.

References

1762 births
1821 deaths
American people of the Moravian Church
American Protestant missionaries
Female Christian missionaries
American diarists
Women diarists
19th-century American women writers
19th-century American non-fiction writers
American women botanists
19th-century American botanists
19th-century American women scientists
People from Bethlehem, Pennsylvania
People from Murray County, Georgia
Religious leaders from Pennsylvania
Writers from Pennsylvania
Writers from Georgia (U.S. state)
Scientists from Pennsylvania
Scientists from Georgia (U.S. state)
American women non-fiction writers
Missionary botanists
Moravian Church missionaries
Protestant missionaries in the United States